Hồ Khắc Ngọc (born 2 August 1992) is a Vietnamese footballer who plays as a forward or a central midfielder for V-League (Vietnam) club Viettel Despite long injury layoffs Khắc Ngọc is known to be an intelligent passer of the ball with an 89% completion rate. He also holds the record for the most corner kicks taken in a V-League season.

References 

1992 births
Living people
Vietnamese footballers
Association football forwards
Association football midfielders
V.League 1 players
Song Lam Nghe An FC players
People from Nghệ An province
Vietnam international footballers